‘Abd al-Quddūs Jalāl ad-Dīn, best known as Shah Makhdum, and also known as Rupos, was a Sufi Muslim figure in Bangladesh. He is associated with the spread of Islam into the Varendra region of Bengal. He arrived in Bengal with his elder brother Syed Ahmad (Miran Shah) from Baghdad. Shah Makhdum Airport of Rajshahi, is named after him.

Life
The exact birth date of Shah Makhdum is not known but he was born in Baghdad. His father was Azala Shah, who was said to have been a descendant of Abdul Qadir Gilani. He came to Lakshmipur in Noakhali, where he established a khanqah in the village now known as Shyampur. His elder brother, Syed Ahmad Miran Shah, established a khanqah in the nearby village of Kanchanpur. He earned the nickname of Rupos as he was known to cover his face with a piece of cloth in the manner of a section of the saints of the Chishti Order.

Two years later, he migrated with his companions to Bagha in Varendra after hearing that contemporary Muslim preacher Shah Turkan and his comrades were murdered by the local tantric Raja Angsu Deo Chandavandi Varmabhoj and sacrificed to Mahakala. To avenge Turkan, Makhdum and his companions defeated the Raja and subsequently established a khanqah in Rampur Boalia (modern-day Rajshahi City). Makhdum then sent his companions to the adjoining areas to set up khanqahs and preach for Islam. Bagha was later renamed to Makhdumnagar in his honour. Some of his companions here included Syed Shah Abbas, Syed Dilal Bukhari, Shah Sultan, Shah Karam Ali and Nusrat Shah. Shah Makhdum spent the rest of his life propagating in Rajshahi.

Death
It is unknown how, but Makhdum died on 27 Rajab and was buried at Dargah Para in Rampur Boalia. Although some sources mention the year corresponding to 1313 CE others suggest he died in 1592 CE at the age of 117. During the Mughal period, Ali Quli Beg, a Twelver Shia and servant of Abbas the Great, constructed a square-shaped one-domed mazar (mausoleum) above the grave. Devotees commemorate Makhdum's death every year with an urs on 27 Rajab at the Dargah premise. The Mutawalli (guardian) of the shrine in 1877 stated that the shrine estate was made rent-free as a gift by Mughal emperor Humayun.

In 1904, the ninth Mutawalli of the estate, Ghulam Akbar, made a statement at the Rajshahi District Court mentioning that although the estate was established in 1634, Shah Makhdum Rupos was alive 450 years before that (thus placing him in the 12th century in 1184 AD). Shah Nur was the first Mutawalli of the shrine.

Eponyms
Shah Makhdum Airport
Shah Makhdum Thana
Shah Mokhdum Medical College
Shah Makdum Hall, University of Rajshahi
Shah Mokhdum College, Rajshahi

References

External links

Indian people of Arab descent
Indian people of Iraqi descent
People from Baghdad
14th-century Indian Muslims
13th-century Indian Muslims
Bengali Sufi saints
Sufi mystics
People from Rajshahi District
1313 deaths
1592 deaths